Beegden is a village in the Dutch province of Limburg. It is a part of the municipality of Maasgouw, and is located about 6 km west of Roermond.

Until 1991, Beegden was a separate municipality. During that year the village became part of the municipality of Heel en Panheel. In 2007 the municipality of Heel en Panheel, including Beegden, became part of the new municipality of Maasgouw. The town currently has about 1800 inhabitants.
During the past few years tourism has developed in Beegden, the key attractions of the town are the church, the seventeenth-century house  and the St. Lindert windmill. The last underwent a major restoration in 2000 and can be visited free of charge every Wednesday and Saturday.

Born in Beegden
 Annemiek Derckx (born 1954), Dutch canoer who twice won a bronze medal at the Summer Olympics

Gallery

References

Former municipalities of Limburg (Netherlands)
Populated places in Limburg (Netherlands)
Maasgouw